Boron triazide, also known as triazidoborane, is a thermally unstable compound of boron and nitrogen with a nitrogen content of 92.1 % (by the standard atomic weight). Formally, it is the triazido derivative of borane and is a covalent inorganic azide. The high-energy compound, which has the propensity to undergo spontaneous explosive decomposition, was first described in 1954 by Egon Wiberg and Horst Michaud of the University of Munich.

Preparation 
The first method is by the addition of diborane to a solution of hydrazoic acid in diethyl ether at a temperature range between −20 °C and −10 °C. This synthesis proceeds via the intermediates monoazidoborane, and diazidoborane, .

The compound can also be obtained by passing boron tribromide vapor over solid silver azide in high vacuum.

A similar gas-phase synthesis uses the spontaneous reaction of boron trichloride with hydrazoic acid.

Properties 
The compound forms colorless crystals that are only stable at low temperatures. Above −35 °C, an explosive decomposition may occur. In the gas phase, generated boron triazide decomposes at room temperature within 60 minutes via loss of nitrogen gas to form boron nitrides with formulas  and BN. These reactions can also be initiated photochemically by UV radiation in the compounds absorption range at about 230 nm.

In contact with water, it undergoes hydrolysis to hydrazoic acid and boron trioxide.

Reaction with other azides like sodium azide or lithium azide yields the corresponding tetraazidoborate complexes.

The parent tetraazidoboric acid, can be obtained at temperatures lower than −60 °C.

Uses 
Due to the low stability, the compound itself is not used as a high-energy substance. However, the tetraazidoborate derivatives and adducts with bases such as quinoline, pyrazine or 2,2,6,6-tetramethylpiperidine have potential for this usage. The gas-phase decomposition of the compound is also of interest as a method of coating surfaces with boron nitride.

References

Further reading 

 

Azido compounds
Boron–nitrogen compounds